Kazi Abu Bakar Siddiky, known as Kazi Riton (born 17 January 1977) is a Bangladeshi producer, actor, writer and director. He is the owner of film and television production company Black & White. He was the International Affairs Secretary of Television Program Producers Association of Bangladesh (2019-2021). Currently, he is serving as an Executive Member of Television & Digital Program Producers Association of Bangladesh.

Early life 
Kazi Riton was born on 17 January 1977 in Natore, Bangladesh. His father is Kazi Abdur Rashid and mother is Salina Banu.

Career 

Kazi Riton arrived in Dhaka in 1998 with only eight thousand taka in his pocket. Early in his career he played in theater and worked as an assistant director in TV media. Then he started working in the film and TV media sector of Bangladesh regularly since 2000. He has performed in several drama serials & TV Movies, including ‘Dour’ (2004), on BTV (Bangladesh Television, the state-owned National Television network), ‘Binocular’ (2005) on NTV, ‘Groho Konna’ (2006) on NTV, ‘Bachelor Dompoti’ (2007) on BanglaVision and ‘A Team’ (2013) on Channel i, written by Masud Sezan and directed by Tania Ahmed. Besides these, he has appeared as a model in several commercials like AKTEL (mobile network operator), Jamuna Bank, Bangladesh Biman Airlines etc. Kazi Riton made his film debut in ‘Chandragrohon’ in 2008, directed by Bangladesh National Film Award-winning director Murad Parvez. The film won seven Bangladesh National Film Awards, and other awards.

Producer 
Besides acting, Riton started business in media sector as one of the partners of ‘5.Com’, where other partners were famous actresses Bijori Barkatullah and Ipshita Shabnam Srabonti, popular singer and actor Partha Barua. Critically acclaimed drama serial Ditiyo Jibon (2003) which ran successfully on ATN Bangla, written by Anisul Hoque and directed by S.A. Haque Olike, was one of the major productions of ‘5.com’. He worked as executive producer and producer in film and TV media.

He is the Associate Producer of the financially successful film ‘Hridoyer Kotha’ (2006), starring National Award-winning actors Riaz and Purnima.

Personal life 
Kazi Riton married to Mumtaz Alia Akbari in 2004. The couple has three daughters. Riton has established a charitable organization, 'Kazi Foundation' for child rights and Education.

Filmography

Films

Television

Awards 

 CJFB Performance Award - 2020; Drama: Apa; Category: Best Producer 
 Babisas Award - 2021; Telefilm: Chaya Shikari; Category: Best Producer
 BABISAS Award 2019; Drama Television: “Cheletir Maa Chilona” Producer: Kazi Riton, aired on: ATN Bangla

References

External links
 

1977 births
Bangladeshi television directors
Bangladeshi film producers
Living people